Buckland Beacon is a granite tor and conical beacon, near to the village of Buckland-in-the-Moor on Dartmoor, England. It is well known for its Ten Commandments Stones, which are inscribed on its south eastern edge.

The elevated position meant that it was the location of a fire beacon to warn of danger, and the tor takes its name from this role.

The Ten Commandments stones

Buckland Beacon is famous for a number of the rocks around its base having been faced and cut with the wording of the Ten Commandments.

These were commissioned in 1927 by the land owner William Whitley, then resident at Wellstor, and Lord of Buckland Manor, and completed in 1928. The carving was done by local sculptor WA Clement, who worked directly from the current prayer book.

Mr Whitley ordered the Ten Commandments to be carved after he learned of plans to revise the Book of Common Prayer. The proposed revisions would have aligned the Church of England more closely with Catholic teachings and practices. Whitley was a dedicated Protestant, and opposed the changes.

The changes were defeated twice in the House of Commons, and the dates of these defeats in Parliament are also inscribed into the rocks, along with the verse from a hymn, and John 13:34. Also featured are the start and end dates of the carving work - December 15th 1927 - June 14th 1928.

The lettering has suffered from weathering, resulting in it needing to be recut a number of times. Most recently it was recut in 2016, at the cost of £16,000.

Jubilee stone
In addition to the Ten Commandments, there is a further carved rock on the summit of the tor, called the Jubilee Stone.

The Jubilee Stone was inscribed in celebration of the Silver Jubilee of George V and reads:

Unlike the Ten Commandments rocks, the Jubilee Stone has not been upkept, and is now barely visible.

It is also notable that the inscription states 1282ft, which is nearly  shorter than the actual height of the beacon recorded by Ordnance Survey.

The beacon was also used for chains of fire beacons for the millennium celebrations in 2000, and for subsequent jubilees, including those of Queen Elizabeth II.

References

Tors of Dartmoor
Dartmoor